Phaeanthus is a genus of plant in family Annonaceae.

Species 
Plants of the World Online lists the following species:
Phaeanthus impressinervius Merr.
Phaeanthus intermedius (P.Parm.) I.M.Turner & Veldkamp
Phaeanthus ophthalmicus (Roxb. ex G.Don) J.Sinclair (synonyms: P. schefferi Boerl. 1899, P. cumingii Miq. 1858, P. ebracteolatus (C. Presl) Merr. 1908, P. macropodus (Miq.) Diels 1912, P. nigrescens Elmer 1913)
Phaeanthus splendens Miq. (synonym Phaeanthus crassipetalus Becc.)
Phaeanthus sumatrana Miq.
Phaeanthus tephrocarpus Merr.
Phaeanthus vietnamensis Bân
Phaeanthus villosus Merr.

Species now placed in other genera 
Phaeanthus acuminata Merr. 1905 (not found)
Phaeanthus malabaricus, Beddome is a synonym of Polyalthia malabarica (Bedd.) I.M.Turner
Phaeanthus saccopetaloides W.T. Wang  1957 is a synonym of Wangia saccopetaloides (W.T.Wang) X.Guo & R.M.K.Saunders

References 

Annonaceae
Annonaceae genera
Taxonomy articles created by Polbot